is a bullet hell game by Cave, released in 2009. It is the third Cave shoot 'em up to be played using a horizontally-oriented monitor (preceded by Progear and the original Deathsmiles). Deathsmiles II is also the first CAVE arcade game to use polygons instead of their traditional sprites for graphics. A compilation of Deathsmiles I and Deathsmiles II was released on PlayStation 4, Xbox One, and Nintendo Switch in Japan in December 2021.

Gameplay

In Deathsmiles II, players control a character armed with a magical weapon, navigating through levels filled with enemies and obstacles. The game features multiple characters to choose from, each with their own unique abilities and playstyle. As players progress through the game, they can collect power-ups and items to enhance their character's abilities and make them more powerful.

Deathsmiles II also features a "Mega Black Label" mode, which is a harder version of the game with different levels and challenges.

Development and release

Deathsmiles IIX was ported to the Xbox 360 with additional modes in 2010. It was released both regular and limited editions which included a soundtrack CD. On release week, Deathsmiles IIX sold 16,112 copies in Japan according to Media Create. A platinum edition was released in 2011. The unlocalized Japanese release was made available on the US "Games on Demand" store in 2011.

Reception
In Japan, Famitsu gave the X360 version a score of 30 out of 40. GamesRadar rated the XBLA release a 3.5 out of 5 and commented that "despite everything it has going against it, Deathsmiles 2X stands out as one of the better shooters available in the Western market. It’s action-packed, easy to play, tough to master, and has a certain charm to it that makes you forgive its lackluster presentation."

References

External links
 

2009 video games
Arcade video games
Cave (company) games
Christmas video games
Dark fantasy video games
Horizontally scrolling shooters
Video games scored by Manabu Namiki
Video games developed in Japan
Video games featuring female protagonists
Video games with 2.5D graphics
Xbox 360 games
Multiplayer and single-player video games